Tadhg MacCarthaigh GAA is a Gaelic Athletic Association club based in Caheragh in Cork, Ireland.
This is a Gaelic football only club, with no hurling played. The club in 2008 decided to start an under-12 hurling team, so the club may become a dual club in the future. The club is a member of the Carbery division of Cork GAA.

History
The Tadgh MacCarthaigh GAA Club was founded in 1954. The first playing fields were in Sonny O’Driscoll’s and Dick Kingston’s of Corliss. The club won its first West Cork Junior B Championship in 1958. Since then, their successes included Junior 2 titles in 1968 and 1975 beating Ardfield on both occasions and in 1991 when they beat Kilbrittain. The club has had successes twice in the Under 21 B Championship, beating Timoleague in 1982 and St. Colum's in 1990.

Achievements
 Cork Junior Football Championship Runner-Up 1995
 Cork Minor A Football Championship Winner (1) 1997
 Cork Minor B Football Championship Winner (1) 1991 Runner-Up 2001
 West Cork Junior A Football Championship Winners (6) 1995, 1997, 2002, 2004, 2006, 2012  Runners-Up 1977, 1998, 2008, 2013
 West Cork Junior B Football Championship Winners (4) 1957, 1968, 1975, 1991  Runners-Up 1971, 1989, 1990
 West Cork Junior C Football Championship Winners (1) 2005  Runners-Up 2004, 2006, 2009, 2010
 West Cork Junior D Football Championship Winners (1) 2006
 West Cork Minor A Football Championship Winners (2) 1993, 1997 (as Caheragh)  Runners-Up 1996, 2006
 West Cork Minor B Football Championship Winners (1) 1991 (as Caheragh), 2001  Runners-Up 1990, 2002, 2005
 West Cork Under-21 A Football Championship Runners-Up 1995, 1998
 West Cork Under-21 B Football Championship Winners (2) 1982, 1990  Runners-Up 1989, 2007, 2010, 2012

Notable players
 Pat Hegarty
 Brian O'Driscoll
 Colm O'Driscoll

References

Gaelic games clubs in County Cork
Gaelic football clubs in County Cork